The Russia women's national under-18 and under-19  is a national basketball team of Russia and is administered by the Russian Basketball Federation.
It represents Russia in international under-19 and under-18 (under age 19 and under age 18) women's basketball competitions.

After the 2022 Russian invasion of Ukraine, FIBA banned Russian teams and officials from participating in FIBA 3x3 Basketball competitions.

History

FIBA Under-19 World Championship

FIBA Europe Under-18 Championship

See also
 Russia women's national basketball team
 Russia women's national under-17 basketball team
 Soviet Union women's national under-19 basketball team

References

External links
Archived records of Russia team participations

u19
Women's national under-19 basketball teams